Alberto Express is a 1990 French comedy film directed by Arthur Joffé. It was coproduced with Italy, where it was released as In viaggio con Alberto.  For his performance Sergio Castellitto was awarded at Montreal World Film Festival.

Cast 
Sergio Castellitto: Alberto Capuana
Nino Manfredi: Alberto's father
Marie Trintignant: Clara
Marco Messeri: Ticket inspector
Jeanne Moreau: The baroness
Angela Goodwin: The mother
Michel Aumont: The debtor
Thomas Langmann: Young Alberto
Dominique Pinon: The driver

References

External links

1990 films
1990 comedy films
French comedy films
Films directed by Arthur Joffé
1990s French films